Clark Tippet (October 5, 1954 in Parsons, Kansas – January 28, 1992 in Parsons, Kansas) was a danseur and choreographer. He was a member of the American Ballet Theatre company in New York City. Among other roles, he was the male Spanish Dancer in Mikhail Baryshnikov's production of Tchaikovsky's ballet The Nutcracker. The production was first televised in 1977.

Sources
American Ballet Theatre - Clark Tippet Biography
POBA | Where the Arts Live: Clark Tippet Biography

American choreographers
1954 births
1992 deaths
American male ballet dancers
People from Parsons, Kansas
20th-century American ballet dancers